Bad Magic is the twenty-second and final studio album by the British rock band Motörhead. Released on 28 August 2015, it is the fifth release under the UDR / Motörhead Music collaboration of the previous five years.

Due to the death of founder Lemmy four months after the album's release, the band disbanded after 40 years on the road. Surviving members guitarist Phil Campbell and drummer Mikkey Dee stated to numerous media that the band was finished.

"When the Sky Comes Looking for You" was the only song from this album to be played live. In 2016, the album received an ECHO Award nomination for Best Rock/Alternative International, but eventually lost to Iron Maiden's The Book of Souls.

Recording
Bad Magic was written and recorded in Los Angeles, and Cameron Webb again produced the album. In an interview, Motörhead drummer Mikkey Dee told the press that the recording process was different than previously:

Later Lemmy said the whole album was not recorded live, but they:

The cover of "Sympathy for the Devil" was recorded at the request of pro wrestler Triple H.

The band also recorded a cover of David Bowie's "Heroes" during the recording sessions for the album and it was one of the band's last songs recorded together prior to Lemmy's death that same year. The song would be released two years later on 2017's Under Cöver album.

On 1 December 2022, an expanded edition of the album, Seriously Bad Magic, was announced for release on Silver Lining Records on 24 February 2023, containing "'Heroes'" and two unreleased tracks from the sessions, "Bullet in Your Brain" (which was released as a single to promote the new edition) and "Greedy Bastards". The CD release will also include a live album, Sayonara Folks!, recorded at the Mt. Fuji Rock Festival in 2015, and a box set will contain both releases plus a bonus interview disc, Lemmy: War, Love, Death and Injustice.

Critical reception

Bad Magic received a Metacritic score of 80 out of 100, indicating generally positive reviews from critics. Chad Bowar of Loudwire wrote that the songs on the album had a timeless sound, meaning that listeners wouldn't know if they were written during the year the album was released or in the early '80s.

Ray Van Horn Jr. from Blabbermouth.net, noted that with Bad Magic, given Lemmy's health problems:

However, he continues that:

Sean Barry of Consequence of Sound points to the song, "Till the End", and writes that:

Barry ends the review writing:

Commercial performance
The album debuted on the Billboard 200 at No. 35, No. 2 on the Hard Rock Albums chart, and No. 5 on the Rock Albums chart, selling 10,325 copies in its first week. The album has sold 36,000 copies in the United States as of June 2016.

Track listing

Note: "Heroes" was previously released on Under Cöver (2017).

Personnel
Motörhead
 Lemmy – vocals, bass
 Phil Campbell – guitars, piano on "Sympathy for the Devil"
 Mikkey Dee – drums

Additional musicians
 Jimmi Mayweather and Nick Agee – backing vocals on "Shoot Out All of Your Lights'"
 Brian May – guitar solo on "The Devil"

Production
 Cameron Webb – producer, mixing, engineer
 Sergio Chavez – engineer
 Nick Agee – engineer
 Mike Sassano – engineer
 Kyle McAulay – engineer
 Michael Fernandez – engineer
 Michael Eckes – engineer
 Robin Florent – engineer
 Kris Fredriksson – engineer ("The Devil" and Todd Campbell on "Victory or Die" and "Evil Eye")
 Motörhead – executive producers
 Lemmy – cover design concept, doodles
 Mark DeVito – cover art direction, design
 Steffan Chirazi – creative direction, booklet design
 Kai Swillus – creative direction, booklet design
 Robert John – photography

Charts

Weekly charts

Year-end charts

 Regarding French sales, the SNEP gives Bad Magic's highest position as 14.

References

External links
 
 Bad Magic at UDR

2015 albums
Motörhead albums